La Gloria is an unincorporated community in southern Jim Wells County, Texas, United States.

Education
The La Gloria Independent School District serves students in grades pre-kindergarten through six, while seventh through twelfth graders attend Premont or Brooks County (Falfurrias) schools, the latter including Falfurrias High School.

History
La Gloria is twenty eight miles west of Linn on FM1017 (U.S. Highway 281). It is located two miles north of the FM1017-FM755 intersection. A post office was established there in 1908, and by 1914 the community had a population of fifty, a cotton gin, a general store, and telephone service. The San Antonio and Aransas Pass Railway built a stop at La Gloria in 1914. The post office closed in 1918. In 1936 the community consisted of a school and scattered dwellings and farms. In 1963 La Gloria still had a school, as well as a water tank and an oil refinery. It remained a dispersed community in 1993.

Education
La Gloria is served by the La Gloria Independent School District, the Premont Independent School District and the Brooks County Independent School District.

References

External links
 

Unincorporated communities in Texas
Unincorporated communities in Jim Wells County, Texas